Purify is a mini album released by the Canadian death metal band Axis of Advance in January 2006.

Track listing

2006 albums
Axis of Advance albums